Kvithammer or Kvithammar is a village in the Skatval area of the municipality of Stjørdal in Trøndelag county, Norway.

Kvithammar is mainly known for the Bioforsk Grassland and Landscape Division which is an agricultural research station in the area.

References

Villages in Trøndelag
Stjørdal